The Kid with the 200 I.Q. is a 1983 American made-for-television comedy film starring Gary Coleman and Robert Guillaume. It was broadcast February 6, 1983 on NBC.

Plot
A teenager with great intelligence goes to college at an early age and is roommates with a popular jock and must adjust to adult and college life.

Cast
 Gary Coleman as Nick Newell
 Robert Guillaume as Professor Mills
 Kari Michaelsen as Julie Gordon
 Mel Stewart as Debs
 Darian Mathias as Dinah
 Charles Bloom as Travis Ault
 Clayton Rohner as Jeff Langford
 Harriet Nelson as Professor Conklin
 Dean Butler as Steve Bensfield
 Harrison Page as Walter Newell
 Starletta DuPois as Minna Newell
 Crispin Glover as New Student

References

External links

1983 films
1983 television films
1983 comedy films
American comedy television films
NBC network original films
Films scored by Dennis McCarthy
Films set in universities and colleges
Films directed by Leslie H. Martinson
1980s English-language films
1980s American films